Dragočaj is a village in the municipality of Banja Luka, Republika Srpska, Bosnia and Herzegovina.

Dragočaj used to a Croat inhabited village until the outbreak of the Bosnian War.

Demographics
Ethnic groups in the village include:
2,151 Serbs (90.72%)
141 Croats (5.95%)
79 Others (3.33%)

References

Villages in Bosnia and Herzegovina
Populated places in Banja Luka